Zhan-Aul is a rural locality (a settlement) and the administrative center of Zhan-Aulsky Selsoviet, Kamyzyaksky District, Astrakhan Oblast, Russia. The population was 875 as of 2010. There are 8 streets.

Geography 
Zhan-Aul is located 20 km south of Kamyzyak (the district's administrative centre) by road. Verkhnekalinovsky is the nearest rural locality.

References 

Rural localities in Kamyzyaksky District